Bashkirskaya Chumaza (Başqort Samaźıhı) is a rural locality (a village) in Abzanovsky Selsoviet, Zianchurinsky District, Bashkortostan, Russia. The population was 404 as of 2010. There are 7 streets.

Geography 
Bashkirskaya Chumaza is located 36 km southeast of Isyangulovo (the district's administrative centre) by road. Nizhnyaya Akberda is the nearest rural locality.

References 

Rural localities in Zianchurinsky District